HERO (Heathkit Educational RObot) is a series of several educational robots sold by Heathkit during the 1980s. The Heath Company began the HERO 1 project in October 1979, with the first release in 1982. Models include the HERO 1, HERO Jr., and HERO 2000. Heathkit supported the HERO robot line until 1995. All three were produced as kits, or for more money, prebuilt by Heathkit. The 1980s models are considered collectors items, due to their rarity.  For the most part, they cannot perform practical tasks, but are more geared toward entertainment and education above all.

HERO 1 (ET-18) 

HERO 1 is a self-contained mobile robot controlled by an onboard computer with a Motorola 6808 CPU and 4 kB of RAM. The robot features light, sound, and motion detectors as well as a sonar ranging sensor. An optional arm mechanism and speech synthesizer was produced for the kit form and included in the assembled form.

To make this power available in a simple way, high-level programming languages were created. For example, the ANDROTEXT language is a HERO 1 editor and compiler developed in 1982 for the IBM PC.

HERO 1 is featured on a few episodes of the children's television program Mr. Wizard's World. Byte magazine called HERO 1 "a product of extraordinary flexibility and function ... If you are interested in robotics, Heath will show you the way".

HERO Jr. (RT-1) 

A smaller version called HERO Jr. was released later. Heathkit intended it for the home market, and therefore made it less complex, and more self-contained. Like HERO 1, HERO Jr. has a 6808 processor, but only 2 kB of RAM. It has onboard speech synthesis, a Polaroid sonar range sensor, a light sensor, a sound sensor, and an optional infrared sensor. Other optional components include a pair of extra batteries to double the operational time between charges, from an estimated 4 hours to 8 hours. A remote control accessory allows users to drive the robot around. It includes a motion sensor that causes the robot to croak "SOM-THING-MOVE" when it detects a source of motion.

Heathkit released several add-ons to increase the robot's capabilities, including a transmitter to activate a home security system in the event it senses movement while on "guard duty". Also, additional cartridges with programs and games were produced, as well as a components to allow the user to directly program the robot.

The drive mechanism is backward compared to the HERO 1, with the drive and steering wheel in the back of the robot. The robot can speak several phrases from various films that involve robots or computers. It is capable of remembering and repeating back its master's name, singing songs, reciting poems, acting as an alarm clock, and making its own combinations of phonemes to create a robotic gibberish.

HERO 2000 (ET-19) 

The much more powerful HERO 2000 includes several onboard microprocessors, onboard speech synthesis, several sensors, and the ability to add expansion cards using a passive backplane.

HE-RObot 

The HE-RObot is the result of a strategic partnership between Heathkit and White Box Robotics, marketed to the educational market. Heathkit sold approximately 50 of these robots before bankruptcy in 2012.

See also

 Topo, a programmable robot series for home computers in 1983-1984
 R.O.B., a 1985 video game playing toy robot accessory for the Nintendo Entertainment System 
 Short Circuit, the 1986 sci-fi film starring the robot Johnny Five
 Transformers
 1980s in science and technology

References

Bibliography 

 Howard Boyet: Heath's robot "HERO": 68 experiments : fundamentals and applications, Microprocessor Training 1983. 
 Mark J. Robillard: HERO 1 - Advanced Programming and Interfacing, H.W. Sams 1983. 
 Howard Boyet: Hero 1 - Advanced Programming Experiments, Heathkit/Zenith 1984. 
 John D. Hubbard, Lawrence P. Larsen: Hero 2000 - Programming and Interfacing, Heathkit/Zenith 1986.

External links

General
 Heathkit Robots at Robot Gallery
 The Hero Robot Web Source
 Vintage Hero Robots Family
 Heathkit HERO robot owners user group

HERO 1 (ET-18)
 Video demonstration of HERO 1 (Beginning at 12:30)
 Heathkit HERO 1 Robots - Vintage Heathkit Educational Trainer Robots (HERO 1) ET-18 ETW-18
 Scan of the original brochure for the Hero 1

HERO Jr. (RT-1)

HERO 2000 (ET-19)
 Heathkit Hero 2000 Robots

Heathkit
Hobbyist robots
Educational robots
1982 robots
Robots of the United States
Rolling robots